Vladimir Aleksandrovich Mikhalyov (born 20 July 1987) is a former Russian professional football player.

Club career
He played 4 seasons in the Russian Football National League for FC Luch-Energiya Vladivostok, FC Volgar-Gazprom Astrakhan and FC Sakhalin Yuzhno-Sakhalinsk.

External links
 
 

1987 births
People from Sakhalin Oblast
Sportspeople from Sakhalin Oblast
Living people
Russian footballers
Association football midfielders
FC Olimpia Volgograd players
FC Volga Nizhny Novgorod players
FC Luch Vladivostok players
FC Volgar Astrakhan players
FC Sakhalin Yuzhno-Sakhalinsk players